Cerosterna javana is a species of beetle in the family Cerambycidae. It was described by White in 1858. It is known from Java and Sumatra.

Subspecies
 Cerosterna javana combusta Thomson 1865
 Cerosterna javana tigrina Pascoe 1866
 Cerosterna javana javana White 1858

References

Lamiini
Beetles described in 1858